The Type 903 (NATO reporting name: Fuchi) is a class of replenishment oiler (AOR) built for the People's Liberation Army Navy by the People's Republic of China. They resemble , an AOR built by China for Thailand and delivered in 1996.

Two Type 903s entered service in 2003. Construction of the Type 903A, a slightly modified design, began in 2010; the first Type 903As entered service in 2013.

Development
According to Zhang Gang, chief designer of Similan, China started development of a new AOR in 1988. Development was delayed due to cost, leading China to buy a Komandarm Fedko-class oiler, renamed Qinghaihu, from Ukraine in 1992. The new design was completed for Similan, which became the basis for the Type 903.

Design
The Type 903 is a flush-decked development of the Type 905 AOR resembling the French Durance.

There are two liquid and one sliding-stay solid transfer stations per side. Refuelling may also be conducted from the stern.

Ships of the class

Gallery

References

Sources

Auxiliary replenishment ship classes
Qiandaohu-class replenishment ships